Albert Burton Colechin (19 June 1887 – 25 August 1947) was an Australian rules footballer who played with Collingwood in the Victorian Football League (VFL).

Colechin was just a week shy of his 29th birthday when he made his Collingwood debut in the 1916 VFL season. He had previously played with the Fitzroy Juniors and Prahran.

He was a half back flank in Collingwood's 1919 premiership team. He also appeared in their 1918 and 1920 grand final losses, as a half back flanker and back pocket respectively.

In 1921 he represented the VFL in an interstate fixture against South Australia.

References

1887 births
Australian rules footballers from Victoria (Australia)
Collingwood Football Club players
Collingwood Football Club Premiership players
Prahran Football Club players
1947 deaths
One-time VFL/AFL Premiership players